Jonathan Stinchcomb (born August 27, 1979) is a former American football offensive tackle who played eight seasons in the National Football League (NFL).  He played college football for the University of Georgia.  He was drafted in the second round of the 2003 NFL Draft by the New Orleans Saints, and was a member of the Saints' Super Bowl XLIV championship team, which beat the Indianapolis Colts.

College career
Stinchcomb attended the University of Georgia, where he played for the Georgia Bulldogs football team from 1998 to 2002.  Four-year starter at Georgia…All-Academic honors in 2001-02…One of 11 players to earn AFCA Good Works Team honors for contributions to community service…In 2002 named a Walter Camp All-American, All-SEC and one of six recipients of National Football Foundation scholarship.  Stinchcomb was inducted into the University of Georgia’s Circle of Honor in 2012.  Matt is also a member of the Gridiron Secret Society.

Professional career

New Orleans Saints
After spending his first two years with the Saints as a backup, Stinchcomb missed the entire 2005 season with a knee injury, then took over the starting right tackle position for the Saints in 2006.  He started 86 consecutive games for the Saints over five seasons, was named the team's Man of the Year in 2008, and went to the Pro Bowl in the Saints' Super Bowl-winning 2009 season.  He was released on August 15, 2011, after the Saints' first exhibition game of the 2011 season.  On September 22, 2011, he told a New Orleans radio interviewer that he had decided to retire, with plans to pursue a career in physical therapy.

Personal life

He is the younger brother of Matt Stinchcomb, a former offensive tackle for the Oakland Raiders and Tampa Bay Buccaneers.  He attended Parkview High School in Lilburn, Georgia, where he was a USA Today and Parade All-American.

Stinchcomb is a Christian. Stinchcomb has spoken about his faith saying, "There's a victory that every man can have. And that's an eternity and salvation and that comes through Jesus. So it gives you that solace that you can go out there and you play your heart out and give it all you have. And at end of the day you'll be a winner no matter what."  He is the director of operations for a Gwinnett County, Georgia based organization called NG# (Next Generation 3), which promotes the development of character building and chaplaincy programs in local schools.

On August 9, 2013, Stinchcomb began a stint as television analyst for the Saints' 2013 preseason games, together with Tim Brando.

References

1979 births
Living people
American football offensive tackles
Georgia Bulldogs football players
National Conference Pro Bowl players
New Orleans Saints players
Players of American football from Atlanta